Loftus is a surname. Notable people with the surname include:

Adam Loftus (Archbishop) (1533–1605), Irish Archbishop, Lord Chancellor of Ireland, first provost of Trinity College, Dublin
Adam Loftus, 1st Viscount Loftus (1568–1643), Lord Chancellor of Ireland in 1619
Aisling Loftus (1990–), English actress
Amy Loftus, American singer
Cecilia Loftus (1876–1943), Scottish burlesque performer and actress
Dudley Loftus (died 1616) (1561-1616), an Irish landowner and politician
Elizabeth Loftus (born 1944), American psychologist and author
Ernest Achey Loftus (1884-1987), English soldier, teacher and diarist
Frederick Loftus (1799–1860), cricketer
Hubert J. Loftus (1924-1995), American politician
Jamie Loftus (born 1993), American comedian, writer, podcaster, and actress
John Loftus (born 1950), American author, former US government prosecutor, and former Army intelligence officer
Johnny Loftus (1895–1976), American horse racing jockey
Joseph Philip Loftus, Assistant Director at the Johnson Space Center, Senior 1000 Government Official
Lord Augustus Loftus (Lord Augustus William Frederick Spencer Loftus) (1817–1909), Governor of New South Wales, Australia 1879–1885
Ruben Loftus-Cheek (born 1996), English football player
Seán Dublin Bay Rockall Loftus (1927–2010), Irish barrister, politician, and environmentalist
Thomas Loftus (1917-2011), former Chairman of Leinster Gaelic Athletic Association
Tom Loftus (1856–1910), American professional baseball player and manager
William Loftus (disambiguation)